Foday Sillah (born 12 March 1974) is a Sierra Leonean sprinter. He competed in the men's 400 metres at the 1992 Summer Olympics.

References

1974 births
Living people
Athletes (track and field) at the 1992 Summer Olympics
Athletes (track and field) at the 1996 Summer Olympics
Sierra Leonean male sprinters
Olympic athletes of Sierra Leone
Place of birth missing (living people)